Luis Larrain Stieb (born 30 December 1980) is a Chilean activist for LGBT rights in Chile.

In 2013, Larraín succeeded writer Pablo Simonetti as president of Fundacion Iguales, a major LGBT rights organization in Chile 

As president of the foundation, despite undergoing two kidney transplants, Larraín became one of the main campaigners to achieve the approval of a civil union law in notoriously conservative Chile. Since October 22, 2015 same-sex couples and households headed by same-sex couples have the same legal protections available to opposite-sex married couples within a civil union, except for adoption rights and the title of marriage. Fundación Iguales also promotes dialogue and cooperation with partner groups made up of women and indigenous peoples. In November 2015 he was elected among the top 50 diversity figures in public life by The Economist for his impact on diversity.

Larraín holds a degree in engineering from Pontificia Universidad Católica de Chile and a master's degree in international relations from Sciences Po. He is also a former model.

In 12 March 2017 he announced a candidacy for deputy at the parliamentary elections for the District 10 (communes of Santiago, Providencia, La Granja, Macul, Ñuñoa and San Joaquín), supported by the Citizens party and the Future Sense coalition. However, on 21 August 2017, Larráin announced that he was running as an independent in the centre-right Chile Vamos coalition, supported by Political Evolution.

References

1980 births
Living people
Chilean LGBT rights activists
Chilean LGBT politicians
Chilean gay men
Gay politicians